Deo Bonaventure Munishi (born 6 April 1989) is a Tanzanian football goalkeeper who plays for Lipuli. He was a squad member for the 2008 CECAFA Cup and the 2015 COSAFA Cup.

References

1989 births
Living people
Tanzanian footballers
Tanzania international footballers
Simba S.C. players
Mtibwa Sugar F.C. players
Azam F.C. players
Young Africans S.C. players
Lipuli F.C. players
Association football goalkeepers
Tanzanian expatriate footballers
Expatriate footballers in Oman
Tanzanian expatriate sportspeople in Oman
Expatriate soccer players in South Africa
Tanzanian expatriate sportspeople in South Africa
Tanzanian Premier League players